Jacqueline van Rozendaal-van Gerven (born 20 February 1964) is a Dutch archer. She competed at the 1988 Summer Olympics and the 1992 Summer Olympics.

References

1964 births
Living people
Dutch female archers
Olympic archers of the Netherlands
Archers at the 1988 Summer Olympics
Archers at the 1992 Summer Olympics
Sportspeople from 's-Hertogenbosch
20th-century Dutch women
20th-century Dutch people